"Lonely Island" is the second single released by The Parliaments. It was released in 1960 on the Flipp Record label (FL-45-100). At this stage of their careers, the Parliaments consisted of George Clinton, Grady Thomas, Calvin Simon, Johnny Murray, and Charles "Butch" Davis. There are no writers credits on the single. Like the Parliaments' previous single, Poor Willie/Party Boys, this record highly sought after by P-Funk collectors. The B-side of the single was entitled "(You Make Me Wanna) Cry".

The Parliaments songs
1960 songs